Omega Capricorni, which is Latinized from ω Capricorni, is a star in the southern constellation Capricornus, near the southern constellation border with Microscopium. It is an orange hued star that is faintly visible to the naked eye, having an apparent visual magnitude of +4.11.

This is an evolved K-type giant star with a stellar classification of K4 III, and is a suspected variable. With the supply of hydrogen at its core exhausted, the star has expanded to about 172 times the radius of the Sun. It is 48 million years old with 7 times the mass of the Sun. Omega Capricorni is radiating 6,300 times the luminosity of the Sun from its bloated photosphere at an effective temperature of 3,915 K. It is a barium star, showing an overabundance of the s-process elements. This suggests that Omega Capricorni has an orbiting white dwarf companion.

References

K-type giants
Suspected variables
Barium stars
Runaway stars
Ursa Major Moving Group

Capricorni, Omega
Capricornus (constellation)
Durchmusterung objects
Capricorni, 18
198542
102978
7980